Candace Kathryn Hill (born February 11, 1999) is an American track and field athlete who competes in the 100 metres and 200 metres. She graduated from Rockdale County High School. She became the world's first high school woman to break the 11-second barrier clocking 10.98 in the 100 meters sprint at the 2015 Brooks PR Invitational on 21 June 2015 in Shoreline, Washington, United States.  Her mark, quickly ratified, is the world youth best, the terminology for world record among athletes before the year of their 18th birthday.  Since the mark was set outside of the sanctioned NFHS season, the mark is not eligible for the NFHS High School Record.  Out of season marks like this are recognized by Track and Field News which has not yet published it as the National High School Record. Candace Hill is the first US high school female to run under 11.10 for 100 meters.

Four days later she was named the Gatorade National Girls' Track and Field Athlete of the Year.  She is only the second sophomore to receive the award, after Marion Jones.  She was also Track and Field News "High School Athlete of the Year" in 2015.  On 1 July 2015, she won the Youth qualifying championship in Lisle, Illinois by a quarter of a second, which entitled her to run at the 2015 World Youth Championships in Athletics in Cali, Colombia, where she took the world title at 100 meters and set the championship meet record at 11.08 (+0.0 m/s).  A couple of days later, she completed the sprint double by also winning the 200 meters with a personal best time of 22.43 (-0.7 m/s).

On December 17, 2015, Candace Hill turned professional with ASICS ten-year contract, skipping college athletics.

In 2016, Candace missed 4 months of training and won 2016 USA Junior Championships prelim in 200 meters in 22.76, won prelim and finals in 100 meters in 11.24. A week later, Candace Hill placed 14th in 23.05 in 200 meters at 2016 United States Olympic Trials (track and field) (22.93 in prelim). US sprint sensation Candace Hill's championship record of 11.07 (0.9 m/s) to take the women's 100m IAAF World U20 Championships title at 2016 IAAF World U20 Championships and ran anchor leg of 4×100 meters on a team who won gold in 43.69.

Statistics
Information from World Athletics profile unless otherwise noted.

Personal bests

Seasonal bests

International competitions

National competitions

References

External links

1999 births
Living people
People from Conyers, Georgia
Sportspeople from the Atlanta metropolitan area
Track and field athletes from Georgia (U.S. state)
American female sprinters
21st-century American women